Mette Abildgaard Juulsager (born 12 October 1988 in Føvling at Brædstrup near Horsens) is a Danish politician who is a member of the Folketing and the group chairman of the Conservative People's Party. She was elected to Parliament at the 2015 general election.

Mette Abildgaard has an MSS from Roskilde University, Master of Social Science. She graduated from the university in June 2013. She has a background with PR and communications.

Mette Abildgaard is married to Jens Jacob Abildgaard Juulsager.

Political career
Abildgaard first ran for a political office in the 2009 European Parliament election in Denmark. She received 14.996 votes, but did not get elected. She first ran for the Folketing in the 2011 Folketing election, where she received 1.717 personal votes. This was not enough for a seat in parliament.

In the 2013 Danish local elections she ran for the regional council of the Capital Region of Denmark. With 10.262 she gained a seat in the council.

In the 2015 Folketing election Abildgaard received 3.206 personal votes and gained a seat in the Folketing. She secured reelection in the 2019 Folketing election, receiving 9.101 votes.

External links

References 

Living people
1988 births
Conservative People's Party (Denmark) politicians
Members of the Folketing 2015–2019
Members of the Folketing 2019–2022
Women members of the Folketing
21st-century Danish women politicians
People from Horsens Municipality
Roskilde University alumni
Members of the Folketing 2022–2026